As It Is (often stylised as ΛS IT IS or Λ\\) is a British-American rock duo based in Brighton, England. The band was formed in 2012, and signed to Fearless Records on 2 October 2014. The group consists of lead vocalist Patty Walters and lead guitarist Ronnie Ish.

The band has released seven extended plays and four studio albums. The debut album, Never Happy, Ever After, was released by Fearless Records on 20 and 21 April 2015 in Europe and the US respectively; second album okay. was released on 20 January 2017; third album The Great Depression was released 10 August 2018, and the band's latest album, I Went to Hell and Back was released February 4, 2022.

History

Formation and Never Happy, Ever After (2012–2016)
As It Is was formed in spring 2012 by Minnesota-born Patty Walters, who posted an advertisement stating that he was looking for musicians to be in a pop-punk band using the online service Join My Band. Andy Westhead and Patrick Foley replied to the advertisement and were accepted into the band along with Benjamin Langford-Biss, who Walters knew from university. The band's name comes from a lyric in a song by the American straight edge hardcore band Have Heart.

Walters began his own career by posting song covers on his personal YouTube channel. After the band's formation, the band as a whole worked on a cover of Fat Lip by Sum 41. As the band's career started to gain more traction, he posted less often until he finally announced in the video, titled "A New Chapter", that he would go on an undetermined hiatus for the channel and would be focusing his efforts on As It Is. He has since made clear that he has no intention of returning to YouTube.

The band played local shows for the first couple of years before their first few tours shortly after releasing their fourth EP This Mind of Mine, touring the UK and Europe. The band received a large response from these tours and signed to Fearless Records in October 2014, becoming the first UK band to sign to the label. The band members began working on the group's debut full-length album in 2014 in Florida with producer James Paul Wisner.

The band's debut full-length, Never Happy, Ever After was released on 20 April 2015 in Europe and the following day in the United States under Fearless Records. Three singles were released from the album, "Dial Tones", "Concrete" and "Cheap Shots & Setbacks".

The band performed at every date on the 2015 edition of Warped Tour. The band performed at the 2015 Reading and Leeds Festivals in the United Kingdom.

okay., line-up changes, and The Great Depression (2017–2020)
Their second album, okay., was released on 20 January 2017.

In October 2017, Westhead departed from the band due to "feelings and differences [that] had been building up."

The band recorded their third record in Texas in January 2018, and started teasing new music in May with cryptic messages on their social media accounts.

They released their third album, The Great Depression, on 10 August 2018, which included the singles "The Wounded World", "The Stigma (Boys Don't Cry)", and "The Reaper".

They were approached by Hopeless Records to be a part of the label's new annual compilation series of albums entitled "Songs That Saved My Life", a compilation in which bands cover a song that had a significant impact on them as a whole or individually. The song that As It Is chose was Such Great Heights, which was originally made famous by the indie rock band The Postal Service. The album was released on 9 November 2018. Lead singer Patty Walters was also interviewed by Hopeless Records as a part of a campaign to get kids and teens to seek out help if they are going through personal struggles, which was also the overall message of the album.

At their show at the 02 Forum Kentish Town in London on 1 December 2018, the unofficial world record for the most crowd surfers during an hour-long was set. Over 300 people crowd surfed during the band's set, and over 600 crowd surfed across the sets of all four bands on the bill.

On Monday September 9, 2019 As It Is announced on their social media that Benjamin Langford-Biss would be leaving the band, the band announced an 11 date European farewell tour, supported by Southampton punk rockers Miss Vincent, to pay tribute to his departure.

On Tuesday December 29, 2020, As It Is announced on twitter that drummer Patrick Foley would be leaving the band to pursue a new career as a firefighter.

I Went to Hell and Back (2021–present)
On 27 May 2021, the band released their first single as a trio titled "IDGAF", followed by "I Lie to Me" on 5 August, "ILY, How Are You?" and "IDC, I Can't Take It" on 3 September, "I Miss 2003" on 11 November, and "In Threes" on 9 December. The release of "I Miss 2003" came along with the announcement of the band's fourth album I Went to Hell and Back which released 4 February 2022 by Fearless Records.

On Tuesday, August 23, 2022, As It Is announced bassist Alistair Testo would be leaving the band.

Style and influences
As It Is has been described as a pop punk band with a "melodic, earnest, emo-inspired" sound, compared to the early material of Taking Back Sunday and The Starting Line. The Wonder Years has been listed as a big influence. Never Happy, Ever After has been described as emo and pop punk.

Band members
Current members
 Patty Walters – lead vocals (2012–present), rhythm guitar (2019–2020), drums, percussion (2020–present), bass (2022-present)
 Ronnie Ish – lead guitar, backing vocals (2018–present), rhythm guitar (2020–present)

Touring members
 Maxx Danziger - drums (2021)
 Ross Brown - drums (2022)

Former members
 James Fox – bass guitar (2012–2013)
 Andy Westhead – lead guitar, backing vocals (2012–2017)
 Benjamin Langford-Biss – rhythm guitar, vocals (2012–2019)
 Patrick Foley – drums, percussion (2012–2020)
 Alistair Testo – bass guitar, backing vocals (2014–2022)

Timeline

Discography

Studio albums

Extended plays

Compilation appearances

Singles

Music videos

Festivals
 Vans Warped Tour 2015 (US)
Slam Dunk Festival 2015 (UK)
Reading and Leeds 2015 (UK)
Slam Dunk Festival 2018 (UK) 
Vans Warped Tour 2018 (US)
Slam Dunk Festival 2019 (UK)
Jera On Air Festival 2019 (NL)
2000 Trees Festival 2019 (UK)
Gunnersville Concert Series 2019 (UK)

References
Footnotes

Citations

Sources

External links
 

Musical groups from Brighton and Hove
Musical groups established in 2012
English pop punk groups
Fearless Records artists
British pop punk groups
2012 establishments in England